The 2021 French Open (officially known as the Yonex French Open 2021 for sponsorship reasons) was a badminton tournament which took place at the Stade Pierre de Coubertin in Paris, France, from 26 to 31 October 2021 and had a total prize of US$600,000.

Tournament
The 2021 French Open was the sixth tournament according to the 2021 BWF World Tour as many tournaments got canceled due to the COVID-19 pandemic. It was a part of the French Open, which had been held since 1935. This tournament was organized by French Badminton Federation with sanction from the BWF.

Venue
This international tournament was held at Stade Pierre de Coubertin in Paris, France.

Point distribution 
Below is the point distribution table for each phase of the tournament based on the BWF points system for the BWF World Tour Super 750 event.

Prize money 
The total prize money for this tournament was US$600,000. The distribution of the prize money was in accordance with BWF regulations.

Men's singles

Seeds 

 Kento Momota (semi-finals)
 Viktor Axelsen (first round)
 Anders Antonsen (first round)
 Chou Tien-chen (final)
 Anthony Sinisuka Ginting (withdrew)
 Jonatan Christie (withdrew)
 Lee Zii Jia (first round)
 Ng Ka Long (second round)

Finals

Top half

Section 1

Section 2

Bottom half

Section 3

Section 4

Women's singles

Seeds 

 Akane Yamaguchi (champion)
 Ratchanok Intanon (quarter-finals)
 P. V. Sindhu (semi-finals)
 An Se-young (semi-finals)
 Pornpawee Chochuwong (quarter-finals)
 Michelle Li (withdrew)
 Mia Blichfeldt (first round)
 Busanan Ongbamrungphan (quarter-finals)

Finals

Top half

Section 1

Section 2

Bottom half

Section 3

Section 4

Men's doubles

Seeds 

 Marcus Fernaldi Gideon / Kevin Sanjaya Sukamuljo (final)
 Mohammad Ahsan / Hendra Setiawan (quarter-finals)
 Fajar Alfian / Muhammad Rian Ardianto (semi-finals)
 Aaron Chia / Soh Wooi Yik (semi-finals)
 Satwiksairaj Rankireddy / Chirag Shetty (quarter-finals)
 Kim Astrup / Anders Skaarup Rasmussen (withdrew)
 Ong Yew Sin / Teo Ee Yi (quarter-finals)
 Takuro Hoki / Yugo Kobayashi (quarter-finals)

Finals

Top half

Section 1

Section 2

Bottom half

Section 3

Section 4

Women's doubles

Seeds 

 Lee So-hee / Shin Seung-chan (champions)
 Kim So-yeong / Kong Hee-yong (final)
 Jongkolphan Kititharakul / Rawinda Prajongjai (quarter-finals)
 Nami Matsuyama / Chiharu Shida (semi-finals)
 Gabriela Stoeva / Stefani Stoeva (quarter-finals)
 Chloe Birch / Lauren Smith  (quarter-finals)
 Maiken Fruergaard / Sara Thygesen (second round)
 Pearly Tan / Thinaah Muralitharan (second round)

Finals

Top half

Section 1

Section 2

Bottom half

Section 3

Section 4

Mixed doubles

Seeds 

 Dechapol Puavaranukroh / Sapsiree Taerattanachai (semi-finals)
 Praveen Jordan / Melati Daeva Oktavianti (quarter-finals)
 Yuta Watanabe / Arisa Higashino (champions)
 Marcus Ellis / Lauren Smith (second round)
 Chan Peng Soon / Goh Liu Ying (quarter-finals)
 Thom Gicquel / Delphine Delrue (withdrew)
 Tang Chun Man / Tse Ying Suet (semi-finals)
 Tan Kian Meng / Lai Pei Jing (second round)

Finals

Top half

Section 1

Section 2

Bottom half

Section 3

Section 4

References

External links
 Tournament Link
 Official Website

French Open (badminton)
French Open
French Open (badminton)
2021 in French sport